Kanishka Madhushanka (born 14 March 1997) is a Sri Lankan cricketer. He made his Twenty20 debut on 8 January 2020, for Sri Lanka Air Force Sports Club in the 2019–20 SLC Twenty20 Tournament.

References

External links
 

1997 births
Living people
Sri Lankan cricketers
Sri Lanka Air Force Sports Club cricketers
Place of birth missing (living people)